is a compilation album by Japanese singer/songwriter Mari Hamada, released on June 25, 2003 by Tri-M/MidZet House to commemorate the 20th anniversary of her music career. The album compiles Hamada's singles and songs from 1993 to 2003, including English-language tracks from her international releases Introducing... Mari Hamada and All My Heart. As the sequel to the 1994 compilation Inclination, the album's discs are labeled "Disc 3" and "Disc 4". Inclination II would be followed by Inclination III in 2013.

Inclination II peaked at No. 109 on Oricon's albums chart.

Track listing

Charts

References

External links 
  (Mari Hamada)
 Official website (Tokuma Japan)
 

2003 compilation albums
English-language Japanese albums
Japanese-language compilation albums
Mari Hamada compilation albums
Tokuma Shoten albums